Mike Crossey (born 1979) is a Northern Irish record producer, songwriter, and mixing engineer. He produced the debut single by Arctic Monkeys, collaborating with them over two albums. He is known for his ongoing relationship with The 1975 in addition to productions with Jeremy Zucker, Twenty One Pilots, Walk the Moon, LANY, LAUV, Foals, Keane, Jake Bugg, The Gaslight Anthem, MUNA, Wolf Alice, Yungblud.

Career
Crossey started his career as a promoter of punk shows in Belfast before moving to Liverpool to complete his training at Liverpool Institute for Performing Arts. He remained in Liverpool, operating out of the Motor Museum, until 2012. During that period he produced some of the most critically acclaimed British indie acts.

After seeing the Arctic Monkeys perform, he invited them to the studio and cut the band's first EP Five Minutes with Arctic Monkeys . He contributed production on the second album, Favourite Worst Nightmare, which includes singles such as "Teddy Picker", "Fluorescent Adolescent" and "Brianstorm"

He has since produced and mixed albums by Nothing But Thieves, Foals, Keane, Jake Bugg, Tribes, Blood Red Shoes, The Enemy, The Kooks, and Razorlight.

After studying the sonic nature of BBC Radio One's transmissions, frequency and compression, Mike has developed a solid reputation of creating separate radio mixes specifically suited for the channel. He has done so for acts such as The Black Keys.

2012–2015: Mixing for The 1975, Twenty One Pilots, Jake Bugg, Wolf Alice 
Moving to London in 2012, Crossey embarked on an ambitious year. He mixed the acclaimed Ben Howard album Every Kingdom and Two Door Cinema Club's sophomore Beacon.

Working with a young Nottingham songwriter Jake Bugg, Crossey produced and mixed the singer's eponymous debut album Jake Bugg, which was certified platinum in the UK. The album was a commercial and critical success – receiving a 9/10 in NME and 81/100 on metacritic.

In 2012 Mike produced the Top 10 album for The View's Cheeky for a Reason and mixed The Courteeners' third album ANNA which debuted at number two.

He produced Manchester act The 1975's self-titled debut album, the American band The Gaslight Anthem's fifth album Get Hurt and the track "The Judge" off of Twenty One Pilots' fourth studio album, Blurryface.

Crossey also produced the Wolf Alice album My Love Is Cool in 2015 which received a 9/10 score from NME.

2015–2019: Producing for The 1975, Nothing But Thieves, Walk The Moon, MUNA, Half-Alive 
Relocating to LA in 2015, he produced The 1975's second album, entitled I Like It When You Sleep, for You Are So Beautiful yet So Unaware of It- the album received significant critical praise upon its release in 2016.

In 2017 he scored a no2 UK album with British band Nothing But Thieves's second album Broken Machine which he produced, mixed and contributing to writing.

He produced the third Walk the Moon album What If Nothing, including single One Foot - the highest selling alternative single of the year.

In 2018 he continued his relationship with The 1975 - mixing the album while the band took over production detail. He produced LANY's acclaimed second album, Malibu Nights, as well as an album for Billy Raffoul and mixed songs for Hozier. Crossey produced LAUV and LANY's collaborative track, Mean It, released 14 November 2019. MUNA's Number One Fan - the first from the Crossey produced album. He produced 4 songs off the 2019 Half-Alive album Now, Not Yet.

2020–present: Producing for YUNGBLUD, Noah Cyrus, Jake Wesley Rodgers, The Killers 
Crossey continued to revisit productions or mixing with the likes of LANY and The 1975 on their albums in 2020.

He produced songs for YUNGBLUD, The Killers,  Jeremy Zucker, Half Alive and  Jake Wesley Rogers. His mix CV expanded to include albums by LAUV, Beabadoobee, The Wombats, Bad Suns and others.

In 2022, he completed production and mixing of Noah Cyrus' debut solo album. 

Additionally, he handled the production of two tracks on Louis Tomlinson's second studio album.

Songwriting and production discography

See also
All the Way Back to Liverpool

References

British record producers
Living people
1979 births